Kellie Armstrong (née McGrattan; 8 September 1970) is an Alliance Party politician from Northern Ireland. She has been a member of the Legislative Assembly, the Northern Ireland Assembly, for the Strangford constituency since the 2016 Assembly elections.

Political career

Armstrong has been an active member of the Alliance Party since 2009. She has held various positions within the Alliance Party including: secretary and chair of the Strangford Association branch, convenor of the Political Organisation – a committee of the Party Executive that oversees election and activist activities, member of the Party Executive, a member of the Alliance Women's Group and Vice Chair of the Party.

Armstrong was co-opted onto Ards Borough Council to replace retiring member Kieran McCarthy. She was then elected in 2014 to Ards and North Down Borough Council representing the Ards Peninsula. 

Armstrong stood as the Alliance Westminster candidate in 2015 and  2019 securing the highest-ever vote for an Alliance representative in the Strangford constituency. 

Armstrong was elected to the Northern Ireland Assembly in 2016 and again in 2017.

Armstrong is the Deputy Chair of the Northern Ireland Assembly's Committee for Communities and holds to account the department's actions with respect to housing, benefits, social strategies, Arts, Heritage and Sport. She is also the Alliance member of the Assembly and Executive Review Committee. 

Armstrong is an advocate of Integrated education and is taking forward her private member's bill to legislate for better protection and promotion of integrated education across Northern Ireland.

She brought forward a motion calling on the NI Assembly to end use of designations and mandatory coalition.

Career before politics

For almost a decade, Armstrong was the Northern Ireland Director of the Community Transport Association (CTA). She gave legal and technical advice to organisations and government on transport legislation and passenger transport operations. Armstrong provided business development and governance advice for over 150 community organisations to enable better delivery of accessible transport services.

Personal life
Armstrong is married and has one daughter who attended integrated education. 

She is a politician with moderate hearing loss and an active campaigner on disability rights. 

She lives on a wildlife reserve on the Ards Peninsula.

References

External links 
 Link to Alliance Party Profile
 Official Website

1970 births
Living people
People from County Down
Alliance Party of Northern Ireland MLAs
Northern Ireland MLAs 2016–2017
Northern Ireland MLAs 2017–2022
Alumni of Queen's University Belfast
Female members of the Northern Ireland Assembly
Members of Ards Borough Council
Women councillors in Northern Ireland
Northern Ireland MLAs 2022–2027